The 2022 Zug Open was a professional tennis tournament played on outdoor clay courts. It was the 1st edition of the tournament and part of the 2022 ATP Challenger Tour. It took place in Zug, Switzerland between 25 and 31 July 2022.

Singles main draw entrants

Seeds 

 1 Rankings as of 18 July 2022.

Other entrants 
The following players received wildcards into the singles main draw:
  Kilian Feldbausch
  Jérôme Kym
  Johan Nikles

The following players received entry into the singles main draw as special exempts:
  Harold Mayot
  Zsombor Piros

The following players received entry from the qualifying draw:
  Ugo Blanchet
  Kimmer Coppejans
  Viktor Durasovic
  Lorenzo Giustino
  Ernests Gulbis
  Maximilian Neuchrist

The following players received entry as lucky losers:
  Yshai Oliel
  Otto Virtanen

Champions

Singles

 Dominic Stricker def.  Ernests Gulbis 5–7, 6–1, 6–3.

Doubles

 Zdeněk Kolář /  Adam Pavlásek def.  Karol Drzewiecki /  Patrik Niklas-Salminen 6–3, 7–5.

References

Zug Open
2022 in Swiss tennis
July 2022 sports events in Switzerland